Timorodes is a genus of moths of the family Noctuidae.

Species
 Timorodes blepharias Meyrick, 1902

References
Timorodes at funet

Chloephorinae